Lancer is an American Western series that aired Tuesdays at 7:30 pm (EST) on CBS from September 24, 1968, to June 23, 1970. The series stars Andrew Duggan as a father with two half-brother sons, played by James Stacy and Wayne Maunder.

Synopsis
Duggan starred as Murdoch Lancer, the patriarch of the Lancer family. Maunder played Scott Lancer, the educated older son and a veteran of the Union Army. Stacy played gunslinger Johnny Madrid Lancer. Paul Brinegar appeared as Jelly Hoskins and Elizabeth Baur played Murdoch Lancer's ward Teresa O'Brien.

Lancer lasted for 51 hour-long episodes and was shot in color. It was rerun on CBS during the summer of 1971.

Cast
 James Stacy as Johnny Madrid Lancer
 Andrew Duggan as Murdoch Lancer
 Wayne Maunder as Scott Lancer
 Paul Brinegar as Jelly Hoskins 
 Elizabeth Baur as Teresa O'Brien

Guest stars included Joe Don Baker, Noah Beery, Jr., Scott Brady, Ellen Corby, Bruce Dern, Jack Elam, Sam Elliott, Beverly Garland, Kevin Hagen, Ron Howard, Wright King, Cloris Leachman, Barbara Luna, George Macready, Warren Oates, Stefanie Powers, Tom Selleck, and William Tannen.

Episodes

Season 1 (1968–69)

Season 2 (1969–70)

Production
The pilot episode "The High Riders" was mostly filmed on-location in and around the hacienda now located within The Santa Lucia Preserve. All interior shots of the Hacienda in subsequent episodes were filmed on a sound stage in Hollywood, recreated from photographs of the original.

Awards
The episode titled "Zee" with Stefanie Powers earned scriptwriter Andy Lewis the Western Writers of America Spur Award, the first designated for a television script.

In popular culture
The 2019 movie Once Upon a Time in Hollywood incorporates a fictionalized account of the filming of Lancer's pilot episode, depicting fictional actor Rick Dalton (Leonardo DiCaprio) appearing as a villain in the episode. Director Sam Wanamaker and series stars James Stacy and Wayne Maunder are depicted. Additional scenes are featured in the novelization of Once Upon a Time in Hollywood as well depicting other actors including Andrew Duggan.

References

External links

 

1968 American television series debuts
1970 American television series endings
CBS original programming
English-language television shows
1970s Western (genre) television series
Television series by 20th Century Fox Television
1960s Western (genre) television series